Maikaika is a common name for any of several New Zealand plants with edible underground parts:

 Arthropodium cirratum, also called rengarenga lily
 Orthoceras strictum, also called horned orchid
 Thelymitra pulchella, another orchid